The Edward R. Murrow Award may refer to one of several awards named after American journalist Edward R. Murrow:

 Edward R. Murrow Award (Corporation for Public Broadcasting), given out to individuals in public radio since 1977
 Edward Murrow Award (Overseas Press Club of America), given annually since 1978 for "Best TV interpretation or documentary on international affairs"
 Edward R. Murrow Award (Radio Television Digital News Association), given to broadcast news organizations since 1971
 Edward R. Murrow Award (Washington State University), a journalism/communication honor extended by the Edward R. Murrow College of Communication of Washington State University since 1992
 Edward R. Murrow Award for Excellence in Public Diplomacy, given to a U.S. State Department employee by the Fletcher School at Tufts University